Khairani Paro (Khairani Colony) is a colony in Tando Qaiser named after Khair Muhammad Nizamani, a son of Aludo Khan Nizamani and grandson of Nizam-ud-din.
People of this Paro are called Khairani.

Overview 
Khairani Paro has its own Masjid, called Khairani Masjid and a well Kharo Khooh (Salty Well) approximately 150 years old because the well had salty water when it was dug. Now, however, it gives normal water.

References 

Populated places in Hyderabad District, Pakistan